Coyote is a 1992 Canadian and French comedy-drama film based on a novel. The film starred Mitsou who was a very popular singer around the time of release.

The film starred Mitsou as Louise Coyote and Patrick Labbé as two Montreal teenagers who are in love.

External links

References

1992 comedy-drama films
1992 films
Films based on Canadian novels
Films set in Montreal
Films shot in Ontario
French comedy-drama films
Films shot in Montreal
Films directed by Richard Ciupka
Canadian comedy-drama films
French-language Canadian films
1990s Canadian films
1990s French films